Axonya is a genus of ground beetle in the subfamily Broscinae. The genus was described by Herbert Edward Andrewes in 1923 with species being found across Southern Asia and containing the following species:

 Axonya championi Andrewes, 1923
 Axonya farsica Dostal and Zettel, 1999
 Axonya similis Dostal and Zettel, 1999

References

Broscinae
Insects of Asia
Carabidae genera